The 421 class are a class of diesel locomotives built by Clyde Engineering, Granville for the Department of Railways New South Wales in 1965/66. These mainline locomotives were a follow on from the 42 class. The 421s retained the classic bulldog nose as with the other Clyde built GM and S locomotives at one end, but featured a flat-cab at the other end. In this respect, they are unique amongst bulldog nose locomotives in the world.

History
The 421 class initially entered service on the Main South line before being transferred to Bathurst in 1970 to operate services on the Main Western line between Lithgow and Broken Hill including the new Indian Pacific service. However, due to their poor ride quality, they were returned to the Main South. In 1982, they were briefly used on through services to Melbourne.

All 10 were withdrawn from service in December 1986 and January 1987 and put in store at Junee Locomotive Depot, even though some had only recently been overhauled. In June 1989, two were moved to Cardiff Locomotive Workshops. One was resurrected from July 1989 until January 1990 before most were offered for sale in 1990.

Four locomotives were purchased by Northern Rivers Railroad. After undergoing some restoration work at Junee in October 1996, they worked to their new base at Casino where the work was completed ready for the commencement of operations in October 1997. Northern Rivers Railroad used them to haul the Ritz Rail tourist rail service from Casino to Murwillumbah on the Murwillumbah line and various freight and infrastructure trains on the North Coast line as a sub-contractor to FreightCorp. Northern Rivers Railroad purchased 42106 from a private owner, and moved it from storage at the New South Wales Rail Transport Museum, Thirlmere to Casino in September 1998.

All were included in the sale from Interail to QR National in March 2002, who regularly operated them as far south as Melbourne. Three were withdrawn and placed in store in January 2013 with one remaining in service.

Two have been preserved. In December 2009, 42101 was transferred from the Goulburn Rail Heritage Centre to Eveleigh Railway Workshops for restoration by 3801 Limited. After being fitted with refurbished traction motors at Chullora Railway Workshops in October 2011, it returned to Eveleigh to be restored back to operational condition in March 2012. It undertook its first trials on Cowan Bank on the evening of 25 October 2014 and was repainted in its original Indian red livery by UGL Rail, Auburn in January 2015.

In January 2011, 42102 moved from storage on Kooragang Island to the Dorrigo Steam Railway & Museum.

In mid 2016, units 42109 and 42106 were scrapped by Aurizon. 42109 had been in storage since 2011 due to an engine fire and 42106 was part way through a conversion to run on pulverised coal, before the conversion was stopped and the unit sat stored for several years. 

In late 2017, 42103 and 42105 were bought by a private owner for preservation. This locomotive was reactivated and made its first trip to Rothbury in December 2017. 42103’s first trip after reactivation was working Lachlan Valley Railway's Blue Seude Express to Parkes with 4204 & 4716 in January 2018. Since then, it worked the Australia Day Flyer to Kiama and has been seen running light engine in numerous locations. It has now been affectionately named “Chumster”.

Fleet Status

References

Further reading

External links

Flickr gallery

Aurizon diesel locomotives
Clyde Engineering locomotives
Co-Co locomotives
Diesel locomotives of New South Wales
Railway locomotives introduced in 1965
Standard gauge locomotives of Australia
Diesel-electric locomotives of Australia
Streamlined diesel locomotives